FK Radnički Sremska Mitrovica is a professional football club based in Sremska Mitrovica, Vojvodina, Serbia. They compete in the Serbian First League, the second tier of the national league system.

History
The club was founded on 15 April 1922. They won the Vojvodina League in the 1966–67 season and took promotion to the Serbian League North. The club competed for two seasons in the third tier of Yugoslav football, before suffering relegation in the 1968–69 season.

After spending four seasons in the Vojvodina League West, the club finished as champions in the 2011–12 season and earned promotion to the Serbian League Vojvodina. They spent eight consecutive seasons in the third tier, placing third on two occasions. In 2020, the club was administratively promoted to the Serbian First League.

Honours
Vojvodina League / Vojvodina League West (Tier 4)
 1966–67 / 2011–12

Seasons

Players

First-team squad

Notable players
For a list of all FK Radnički Sremska Mitrovica players with a Wikipedia article, see :Category:FK Radnički Sremska Mitrovica players.

Managerial history

References

External links
 Club page at Srbijasport

1922 establishments in Serbia
Association football clubs established in 1922
Football clubs in Vojvodina
Football clubs in Serbia
Sremska Mitrovica